Miao Tien (6 December 1925 – 19 February 2005) was a Chinese film actor mostly active in Hong Kong and Taiwan.

Biography
Miao graduated at the Teachers College in Xuzhou and was working as an elementary school teacher when the civil war erupted. He joined the National Revolutionary Army and after the Communist victory moved to Taiwan. He continued to work for the army, which assigned him to be an actor in educational films. In 1956 the authorities asked him to join the government-owned Central Motion Picture Corporation (CMPC), where he started a career as a professional actor. Miao was not particularly successful at CMPC and moved to the privately owned Union Film Company. There, he achieved success with martial arts films. By the end of his career, he had starred in more than 100 such films and had become a recognizable name in the field. He died of cancer in 2005.

Selected filmography

Du mei gui (1966)
Dragon Inn (1967)
Diao Chan yu Lu Bu (1967)
Yi dai jian wang (1968) - Chou Fu
Jiang hu ke (1969)
Tie niang zi (1969)
The Seisure Soul Sword of a Blind Girl (1970)
Yin juan nu xia (1970)
Lie huo (1970)
Hei bai dao (1971)
Shuang qiang Wang Ba Mei (1971)
Xia yi shuang xiong (1971)
Du hang da biao ke (1971)
Duo ming jin jian (1971)
Jian (1971)
A Touch of Zen (1971)
Zhui ming qiang (1971) - Prime Minister Sing Pa Tou
Yi fu dang guan (1971)
Wan li xiong feng (1971)
Shi wan jin shan (1971)
Long hu da jue dou (1971)
Da sha xing (1971)
Da mo ying xiong zhuan (1971) - Jiu Ching
Ci man wang (1971)
Da di long she (1972) - Tsao Ming Chiu
Ba wang quan (1972)
Yan zi Li San (1972)
Tie san jiao (1972)
Nu quan shi (1972)
Ying peng ying (1972)
The Bold Three (1972) - Boss Tiger Shih Hou
Jiang hu nu er (1972)
Bi hu you long (1972)
Chao Zhou nu han (1973)
Gan jin sha jue (1973)
Qi sha jie (1973)
Heng chong zhi zhuang nu sha xing (1973)
Nu wang feng (1973) - Hsiung Yi Tien
Shuang tian zhi zun (1973) - Lung, Casino Owner
Ye hu (1973)
Tu bo guo ji si wang xian (1973)
Tie han jing hun (1973)
Ying xiong bang (1974)
Gui ma liang jin gang (1974)
Hu wa er (1974)
Zhu Jiang da feng bao (1974)
Hei shou jin gang (1974)
Wu long da zhui sha (1974)
Hu dan zhui hun (1974)
Guangdong hao han (1974)
Da yin mou (1974)
Da mo tian ling (1974)
Chu zu zuo shou di ren (1974)
Fei che long hu dou (1975)
The Empress Dowager (1975) - Eunuch Li Lien-ying
Da qian shi jie (1975)
Pai an jing ji (1975)
Qi mian ren (1975) - 1st leg
Qiang yu hen (1975)
Da jiang nan bei (1975) - Beret
The Last Tempest (1976) - Li Lien Ying
Ba dao lou zi (1976) - Hsi Yi
Ba bai zhuang shi (1976)
Ying lie qian qiu (1976)
Bao biao (1976)
Shaolin Wooden Men (1976)
Hei long hui (1976)
Fu chou zhe (1976)
Feng yun ren wu (1977)
Shui ling long (1977)
Long she xia ying (1977)
Jin luo han (1977)
Leng yue gu xing jian wu qing (1977)
Sheng jian feng yun (1977)
Jiao jiao bing tuan (1977)
Ren ba zhao (1977)
Tuo gu gui jian lang yan (1977)
Bai Yu Jing (1977)
Snake & Crane Arts of Shaolin (1978) - Leader Gu
Tian ya wei gui ren (1978)
Yi zhao ban shi chuang jiang hu (1978) - Mr. Wan
Zhan tian shan (1978)
Bai zhan bao shan he (1978)
Zhen bai she zhuan (1978)
Yu qing ting (1978)
Qi shi er sha xing (1978)
You ling shen (1979)
Du jiao he (1979)
Xiang ye qi tan (1979)
Hu tu fu xing chuang jiang hu (1979)
Zui hou nu (1979)
Mang han dou lao qian (1979)
La shou xiao xi (1979)
Jin yi wei (1979)
Cheng gong ling shang (1979)
Bi xue huang hua (1980)
Di yu tian tang (1980)
Cai yang nu bang zhu (1980) - Dragon Master
You wo wu di (1980)
Shi wan shan feng yun (1980)
Ling ling wu shi (1980)
Lang zi de yan lei (1980)
Huang di yu tai jian (1981)
Shou zhi ao chu (1981)
Xin hai shuang shi (1981)
Shen yong tu ji dui (1981)
Tian ya guai ke yi zhen feng (1981)
The Wandering Dragon (1981)
Nu zei (1982) - Hu Chi
Hei juan tao (1982)
Jui gwai chat hung (1983)
Tang Chao qi li nan (1985)
Ninja Dragon (1986)
Du mo (1991)
Rebels of the Neon God (1992) - Father
Sheng nu de yu wang (1993)
Man hua wang (1996)
Fei tian (1996)
The River (1997) - Father
San shi er li (1997)
The Hole (1998) - A Shopper
What Time Is It There? (2001) - Father
Goodbye, Dragon Inn (2003) - (final film role)

References

External links

1925 births
2005 deaths
20th-century Chinese male actors
21st-century Chinese male actors
Chinese male film actors
Deaths from lymphoma
Male actors from Jiangsu